Krasna Wieś  (Podlachian; Krásne Sełó, West Polesian: Красне Село) is a village in the administrative district of Gmina Boćki, within Bielsk County, Podlaskie Voivodeship, in north-eastern Poland.

According to the 1921 census, the village was inhabited by 352 people, among whom 60 were Roman Catholic, 273 Orthodox, 12 Mosaic and 7 different. At the same time, 350 inhabitants declared Polish nationality, 2 Belarusian. There were 69 residential buildings in the village.

References

Villages in Bielsk County